Viscount Daventry, of Daventry in the County of Northampton, is a title in the Peerage of the United Kingdom. It was created on 6 May 1943 for Muriel FitzRoy (née Douglas-Pennant), in honour of her late husband, the Hon. Edward FitzRoy, Speaker of the House of Commons from 1928 until his death in 1943. The first Viscountess was the sister of Frank Douglas-Pennant, 5th Baron Penrhyn, whilst Edward FitzRoy was the second son of Charles FitzRoy, 3rd Baron Southampton, and a male-line descendant of Charles FitzRoy, 2nd Duke of Grafton. Lady Daventry was succeeded by her eldest son, the second Viscount. He was a captain in the Royal Navy. He was succeeded by his nephew, the third Viscount. His father had assumed the additional surname of Newdegate, which was that of his father-in-law.  the title is held by his son, the fourth Viscount, who succeeded in 2000. As a male-line descendant of both the third Baron Southampton and the second Duke of Grafton, he is also in remainder to those peerages.

The family seat is Arbury Hall, near Nuneaton, Warwickshire.

Viscounts Daventry (1943)
Muriel FitzRoy, 1st Viscountess Daventry (1869–1962)
Robert Oliver FitzRoy, 2nd Viscount Daventry (1893–1986)
Francis Humphrey Maurice FitzRoy Newdegate, 3rd Viscount Daventry (1921–2000)
James Edward FitzRoy Newdegate, 4th Viscount Daventry (b. 1960)

The heir apparent is the present holder's son the Hon. Humphrey John FitzRoy Newdegate (b. 1995).

Line of Succession

  Francis Humphrey Maurice Fitzroy Newdegate, 3rd Viscount Daventry (1921 - 2000) 
  James Edward Fitzroy Newdegate, 4th Viscount Daventry (born 1960)
 (1) Hon. Humphrey John Fitzroy Newdegate (b. 1995)

See also
Duke of Grafton
Baron Penrhyn
Baron Southampton
Newdigate baronets

Notes

References
Kidd, Charles, Williamson, David (editors). Debrett's Peerage and Baronetage (1990 edition). New York: St Martin's Press, 1990, 

Viscountcies in the Peerage of the United Kingdom
Noble titles created in 1943
FitzRoy family